The O'Brien class of destroyers was a class of six ships designed by and built for the United States Navy shortly before the United States entered World War I. The O'Brien class was the third of five classes of destroyers that were known as the "thousand tonners", because they were the first U.S. destroyers over  displacement.

The design of what became the O'Brien class was the result of discussions between the General Board of the United States Navy and the U.S. Navy's Bureau of Ordnance.

As built, they were armed with four  guns and had four twin 21 inch (533 mm) torpedo tubes with a load of eight torpedoes, but all were later equipped with depth charges. The ships were built by four private American shipyards—Bath Iron Works, Fore River Shipbuilding Company, New York Shipbuilding Corporation, and William Cramp & Sons—and were laid down between September and November 1913; launched between April 1914 and February 1915; and commissioned into the U.S. Navy between June 1914 and August 1915.

All six ships operated in the Atlantic or Caribbean until the U.S. entrance into World War I in April 1917, when all six were sent overseas to Queenstown, Ireland, for convoy escort duties. Several of the ships rescued passengers and crew from ships sunk by U-boats, and several had encounters with U-boats themselves;  helped sink  in November 1917, the first U-boat sunk by the U.S. Navy. All six members of the class had returned to the United States in January 1919 and were decommissioned by June 1922. In 1924, two of the six— and —were commissioned into the United States Coast Guard to help enforce Prohibition as a part of the "Rum Patrol". They were returned to U.S. Navy custody in 1932 and 1933, respectively. All six ships had been sold for scrapping by June 1936.

Background 
For the 1913 fiscal year, the General Board of the United States Navy determined that six destroyers would be authorized. The chief of the U.S. Navy's Bureau of Ordnance (BuOrd) suggested that the new destroyers be equipped with ten torpedo tubes and urged that the new   torpedo be adopted. The General Board agreed in principle, adopting the 21-inch torpedo tubes, but eliminated BuOrd's proposed centerline torpedo tubes and keeping the number of tubes at eight, the same as the Cassin and Aylwin classes. The additional weight of the larger torpedoes,  of top weight, was offset by reducing the planned two aft-facing guns to a single one. This gave the class four  guns, which, again, matched the battery of the Cassin and Aylwin classes. The design for the O'Brien class was approved on 20 August 1912, and authorized by Congress on 4 March 1913.

Design 
The hull shape featured the distinctive high forecastle typical of U.S. destroyer classes since the 1908–09 , the first destroyers designed to be truly ocean-going vessels.

The ships were equipped with two propeller shafts and two direct-drive, Zoelly steam turbines fed by four White-Forster boilers. Because of inherent inefficiency of turbines at low speeds, all of the ships were equipped with supplemental cruising engines for travel at speeds under . Instead of reciprocating engines, Cushing was equipped with a pair of geared steam turbines for cruising.

The O'Brien ships were also equipped with four twin  torpedo tubes, for a total load of eight Mark 8 torpedoes. Although the General Board had called for two anti-aircraft guns for the O'Brien class, they were not originally outfitted with the weapons; the later  was the first American destroyer class so armed. Likewise, there is no record of any of the O'Brien ships being outfitted with mine-laying apparatus. During World War I, most American destroyers were used in anti-submarine warfare roles, and were equipped with depth charges and delivery systems, such as Y-guns and depth charge racks. O'Brien-class ships were equipped with depth charges during the war, but no specific mentions of the types of depth charges used or delivery system are recorded in secondary sources.

Comparisons with other "thousand tonners" 
The "thousand tonners" were the 26 United States Navy destroyers of five classes—Cassin, O'Brien, and Sampson—so named because they were the first U.S. Navy destroyers to have displacements greater than 1,000 long tons. The Cassin class, the first of the thousand tonners, displaced about a third more than the preceding . The introduction of the thousand tonners led to the Pauldings and other older, smaller displacement destroyers of previous classes to be dismissively called "flivvers", a nickname also commonly applied to the Ford Model T.

The O'Brien class was the third of the five classes of "thousand tonners". All five classes were armed with four  guns, but the torpedo size and complement varied. All were equipped with four twin torpedo tubes loaded with eight torpedoes except for the Sampsons (which had four triple tubes carrying twelve torpedoes), but the Cassin  and Aylwin classes were armed with  torpedoes. The O'Brien ships were the first armed with the new  Mark 8 torpedoes; the Tucker and Sampson ships also used the 21-inch torpedoes.

Construction 
The construction of the six O'Brien-class ships was allocated to four U.S. shipbuilders. William Cramp constructed a trio of O'Brien destroyers, while the Fore River Shipbuilding Company, Bath Iron Works, and New York Shipbuilding Corporation built one ship each. The keels for all six ships were laid down between July and November 1913, with  being the first and  the last. All were launched between April 1915 and January 1915, with McDougal again being the first and  being the last. McDougal was commissioned in June 1914, two months after her launch; the rest were commissioned between April and August 1915, with  the final ship to enter service. The cost of each ship for hull and machinery was $790,000.

Ships in class
All six members of the class served in the Atlantic or Caribbean throughout their U.S. Navy careers.

After the United States entered the war in April 1917, all six class members were sent overseas to Queenstown, Ireland, for convoy escort and anti-submarine duties. McDougal was in the first group of six American destroyers that arrived at Queenstown on 4 May; Ericsson and Winslow followed in the second group, which arrived thirteen days later, and Cushing, Nicholson, and O'Brien in the third group, a week after that.

All six ships returned to the United States in January 1919 and served in various roles over the next two years. Cushing was decommissioned in August 1920, followed by Nicholson and McDougal in May 1922, and the remaining three in the following month. In June 1924, two of the six ships—Ericsson and McDougal—were reactivated for service with the United States Coast Guard's "Rum Patrol". Ericsson was returned to the U.S. Navy in May 1932, and McDougal in June 1933; both were sold for scrapping in 1934. O'Brien was sold for scrapping in 1935, and the remaining three in June 1936.

USS O'Brien (DD-51) 

USS O'Brien (Destroyer No. 51/DD-51) was laid down by William Cramp & Sons of Philadelphia in September 1913 and launched in July 1914. The ship was the second U.S. Navy vessel named in honor of Jeremiah O'Brien and his five brothers, Gideon, John, William, Dennis, and Joseph who, together on the sloop Unity, captured a British warship during the American Revolutionary War.

After O'Briens May 1915 commissioning, she sailed off the east coast and in the Caribbean. She was one of the U.S. destroyers sent out to rescue survivors from five victims of German submarine U-53 off the Lightship Nantucket in October 1916. After the United States entered World War I in April 1917, O'Brien was sent overseas to patrol the Irish Sea out of Queenstown, Ireland.

After returning to the United States in January 1919, O'Brien returned to European waters in May to serve as one of the picket ships for the NC-type seaplanes in the first aerial crossing of the Atlantic. O'Brien was decommissioned at Philadelphia in June 1922. She was struck from the Naval Vessel Register in March 1935 sold for scrapping in April.

USS Nicholson (DD-52) 

USS Nicholson (Destroyer No. 52/DD-52) was laid down by William Cramp & Sons of Philadelphia in September 1913 and launched in August 1914. The ship was the second U.S. Navy vessel named in honor of five members of the Nicholson family who gave distinguished service in the American Revolutionary War, the War of 1812, and the American Civil War: brothers James, Samuel, and John Nicholson; William Nicholson, son of John; and James W. Nicholson, grandson of Samuel.

After Nicholsons April 1915 commissioning, she sailed off the east coast and in the Caribbean. After the United States entered World War I in April 1917, Nicholson was sent overseas to patrol the Irish Sea out of Queenstown, Ireland. In November, Nicholson and another U.S. destroyer, were responsible for sinking German submarine , the first submarine taken by U.S. forces during the war.

Upon returning to the United States after the war, Nicholson was placed in reduced commission in November 1919. She was decommissioned at Philadelphia in May 1922. She was struck from the Naval Vessel Register in January 1936 sold for scrapping in June.

USS Winslow (DD-53) 

USS Winslow (Destroyer No. 53/DD-53) was laid down by William Cramp & Sons of Philadelphia in October 1913 and launched in February 1915. The ship was the second U.S. Navy vessel named in honor of John Ancrum Winslow, a U.S. Navy officer notable for sinking the Confederate commerce raider  during the American Civil War.

After Winslows August 1915 commissioning, she sailed off the east coast and in the Caribbean. She was one of the U.S. destroyers sent out to rescue survivors from five victims of German submarine U-53 off the Lightship Nantucket in October 1916. After the United States entered World War I in April 1917, Winslow was sent overseas to patrol the Irish Sea out of Queenstown, Ireland. Winslow made several unsuccessful attacks on U-boats, and rescued survivors of several ships sunk by the German craft.

Upon returning to the United States after the war, Winslow was placed in reduced commission in December 1919. She was decommissioned at Philadelphia in June 1922. In November she dropped her name to free it for a new destroyer of the same name, becoming known only as DD-53. She was struck from the Naval Vessel Register in January 1936 sold for scrapping in June.

USS McDougal (DD-54) 

USS McDougal (Destroyer No. 54/DD-54) was laid down by Bath Iron Works of Bath, Maine, in July 1913 and launched in April 1914.

After McDougals June 1914 commissioning, she sailed off the east coast and in the Caribbean. She was one of the U.S. destroyers sent out to rescue survivors from five victims of German submarine U-53 off the Lightship Nantucket in October 1916, and carried 6 crewmen from a sunken Dutch cargo ship to Newport, Rhode Island. After the United States entered World War I in April 1917, McDougal was part of the first U.S. destroyer squadron sent overseas. Patrolling the Irish Sea out of Queenstown, Ireland, McDougal made several unsuccessful attacks on U-boats, and rescued survivors of ships sunk by the German craft. After a collision with a British cargo ship in February 1918, McDougal was under repair until mid-July, and afterwards, operated out of Brest, France.

Upon returning to the United States after the war, McDougal conducted operations with the destroyers of the Atlantic Fleet until August 1919, when she was placed in reserve, still in commission. After a brief stint of operations in mid 1921, she was placed in reserve until she was decommissioned at Philadelphia in May 1922. In June 1924, Ericsson was transferred to the United States Coast Guard to help enforce Prohibition as a part of the "Rum Patrol". She operated under the name USCGC McDougal (CG-6) until May 1933, when she was returned to the Navy. In November she dropped her name to free it for a new destroyer of the same name, becoming known only as DD-54. She was struck for the Naval Vessel Register in July 1934 sold for scrapping in August.

USS Cushing (DD-55) 

USS Cushing (Destroyer No. 55/DD-55) was laid down by the Fore River Shipbuilding Company of Quincy, Massachusetts, in September 1913 and launched in January 1915. The ship was the second U.S. Navy vessel named in honor of William B. Cushing, a U.S. Navy officer best known for sinking the Confederate ironclad warship  during the American Civil War.

After Cushings August 1915 commissioning, she sailed off the east coast and in the Caribbean. She was one of the U.S. destroyers sent out to rescue survivors from five victims of German submarine U-53 off the Lightship Nantucket in October 1916. After the United States entered World War I in April 1917, Cushing was sent overseas to patrol the Irish Sea out of Queenstown, Ireland. Cushing made several unsuccessful attacks on U-boats, and rescued survivors of several ships sunk by the German craft.

Upon returning to the United States after the war, Cushing was placed in reserve in reduced commission. She was decommissioned at Philadelphia in August 1920. She was struck for the Naval Vessel Register in January 1936 and was sold for scrapping in June.

USS Ericsson (DD-56) 

USS Ericsson (Destroyer No. 56/DD-56) was laid down by the New York Shipbuilding of Camden, New Jersey, in November 1913 and launched in August of the following year. The ship was the second U.S. Navy vessel named in honor of John Ericsson, the Swedish-born builder of the ironclad warship  during the American Civil War.

After Ericssons May 1916 commissioning, she sailed off the east coast and in the Caribbean. She was one of the U.S. destroyers sent out to rescue survivors from five victims of German submarine U-53 off the Lightship Nantucket in October 1916, and carried 81 passengers from a sunken British ocean liner to Newport, Rhode Island. After the United States entered World War I in April 1917, Ericsson was part of the first U.S. destroyer squadron sent overseas. Patrolling the Irish Sea out of Queenstown, Ireland, Ericsson made several unsuccessful attacks on U-boats, and rescued survivors of several ships sunk by the German craft.

Upon returning to the United States after the war, Ericsson conducted operations with the destroyers of the Atlantic Fleet until August 1919, when she was placed in reserve, still in commission. After a brief stint of operations in mid 1921, she was placed in reserve until she was decommissioned at Philadelphia in June 1922. In June 1924, Ericsson was transferred to the United States Coast Guard to help enforce Prohibition as a part of the "Rum Patrol". She operated under the name USCGC Ericsson (CG-5) until May 1932, when she was returned to the Navy. She was sold for scrap in August 1934.

Notes

References

Bibliography 

 
 
 
 
 
 
 
 
 
 
 
 
 
 Silverstone, Paul H., U.S. Warships of World War I (Ian Allan, 1970), .

External links

 
DestroyerHistory.org Thousand Tonner page
DestroyerHistory.org O'Brien class page
Tin Can Sailors@Destroyers.org O'Brien class
NavSource Destroyer Photo Index Page
DiGiulian, Tony Navweaps.com 4"/50 Mks 7, 8, 9, and 10
DiGiulian, Tony Navweaps.com Pre-WWII US Torpedoes
US Navy Torpedo History, part 2 

Destroyer classes